Rivadavia is a central department of Mendoza Province in Argentina.

Districts

Andrade
El Mirador
La Central
La Libertad
Los Árboles
Los Campamentos
Los Huarpes
Medrano
Mundo Nuevo
Reducción
Rivadavia
San Isidro

Sport

The city of Rivadavia is home to Club Sportivo Independiente Rivadavia, a football club that play in the regionalised 3rd Division.

External links
Municipal Website (Spanish)
Club Sportivo Independiente Rivadavia (Spanish)

1884 establishments in Argentina
Departments of Mendoza Province